Lipperscheid is a village in the commune of Bourscheid, in north-eastern Luxembourg.  In 2007 the village had a population of 190, which subsequently increased to 294 by 2019.

References

Bourscheid, Luxembourg
Villages in Luxembourg